This is a list of episodes of the animated series Eek! The Cat and includes The Terrible Thunderlizards and Klutter! segments.

The first season of the show was broadcast on the now-defunct Fox Kids block in 1992 as Eek! The Cat and consisted of thirteen 20 minute episodes featuring Eek! The Cat.

For the second season in 1993, the show format was changed to consist of two nine-minute segments. One was Eek! the Cat and the second was either Eek! the Cat or The Terrible Thunderlizards. When The Terrible Thunderlizards premiered, the series' title was changed to Eek! And The Terrible Thunderlizards. In the third season in 1994, the name was changed to Eek! Stravaganza, retaining the same format used in the second season.

In the fourth season broadcast in 1995, a new segment called Klutter was added, rotating with the Thunderlizards. The fifth season commenced broadcast in September 1996 although the show contained no new Klutter episodes, and the final episodes were aired in the summer of 1997.

Series overview

Episodes

Season 1 (1992)
The first season is titled Eek! The Cat and only consisted of episodes featuring the titular series.

{{Episode table |background=#643190 |overall=5 |season=5 |title=25 |writer=24 |airdate=17 |prodcode=9 |episodes=

{{Episode list
|EpisodeNumber=5
|EpisodeNumber2=5
|Title=Cape Fur
|WrittenBy=Savage Steve Holland & Bill Kopp
|OriginalAirDate=
|ShortSummary=Eek rescues a cute bunny and Wendy Elizabeth and J.B. bring it into the house. However, the mischievous bunny gets Eek into trouble and the family throw shim out. Eek discovers the bunny is an evil psycho rabbit wearing a cute costume who is trying to kill and rob the family, but he manages to save them from a ticking time bomb. Title is a spoof of Cape Fear".Guest appearance: Phil Hartman as Psycho Bunny.
|ProdCode=EC-06
|LineColor=643190
}}

}}

Season 2 (1993–94)
The second season is titled Eek! and The Terrible Thunderlizards' and includes The Terrible Thunderlizards with Eek episodes. In the following list, "TTL" indicates a Terrible Thunderlizards cartoon.

Season 3 (1994–95)
For the third season the title was changed Eek! Stravaganza with Eek and Thunderlizards. "TTL" indicates a Thunderlizards cartoon.

Season 4 (1995–96)
The fourth season of Eek! Stravaganza, started including another segment, called Klutter. In the following list, "TTL" indicates a Thunderlizards cartoon, and "K" a Klutter cartoon.

Season 5 (1996–97)
No new Klutter'' episodes were made. In the following list, "TTL" indicates a Thunderlizards cartoon.

References

Sources
 Library of Congress (most airdates for seasons 1–4)

Eek! The Cat
Eek! The Cat